Walterston is a small farming hamlet just north of Barry in the Vale of Glamorgan in South Wales and west of Dyffryn.

Walterston lies just to west of the Five Mile Lane leading down to Waycock Cross, Barry. The hamlet is very small and has just a few farms, all of which are twelfth to thirteenth century in origin. There are also several houses of which the two largest are the thatched 'Walterston Fach' and its neighbouring 'Trewalter Fawr'. The old monastic village of Llancarfan lies a further two miles to the west.

External links
www.geograph.co.uk : photos of Walterston and surrounding area

Villages in the Vale of Glamorgan